Los Cerrillos is a census-designated place (CDP) in Santa Fe County, New Mexico, United States. It is part of the Santa Fe, New Mexico Metropolitan Statistical Area. The population was 229 at the 2000 census. Accessible from State Highway 14 or The Turquoise Trail, Cerrillos is on the road from Santa Fe to Albuquerque, closer to Santa Fe. There are several shops and galleries, a post office, and the Cerrillos Hills State Park, which has five miles of hiking trails. The Cerrillos Turquoise Mining Museum contains hundreds of artifacts from the American Old West and the Cerrillos Mining District. It also displays cardboard cutouts of characters from the film Young Guns and information on other movies which have been filmed in and around Cerrillos.

Geography

Los Cerrillos is located at  (35.437160, -106.126711). Los Cerrillos is referred to as Cerrillos by local residents.

Demographics

As of the census of 2000, there were 229 people, 111 households, and 59 families residing in the CDP. The population density was 164.5 people per square mile (63.6/km2). There were 129 housing units at an average density of 92.7 per square mile (35.8/km2). The racial makeup of the CDP was 79.04% White, 0.44% Native American, 0.44% Asian, 16.16% from other races, and 3.93% from two or more races. Hispanic or Latino of any race were 50.66% of the population.

There were 111 households, out of which 21.6% had children under the age of 18 living with them, 42.3% were married couples living together, 7.2% had a female householder with no husband present, and 46.8% were non-families. 41.4% of all households were made up of individuals, and 7.2% had someone living alone who was 65 years of age or older. The average household size was 2.06 and the average family size was 2.83.

In the CDP, the population was spread out, with 17.9% under the age of 18, 2.2% from 18 to 24, 31.9% from 25 to 44, 33.2% from 45 to 64, and 14.8% who were 65 years of age or older. The median age was 44 years. For every 100 females, there were 99.1 males. For every 100 females ages 18 and over, there were 106.6 males.

The median income for a household in the CDP was $13,661, and the median income for a family was $31,161. Males had a median income of $30,446 versus $31,250 for females. The per capita income for the CDP was $14,215. About 25.9% of families and 18.4% of the population were below the poverty line, including none of those under the age of eighteen or sixty-five or over.

History

The Tano Indians were the first people in the Cerrillos area. Their pueblos, large and small, were spread out randomly through the Galisteo Basin. Archaeologists believe these sites were occupied by the Tano with no more than a few thousand at once. Some of the pueblos may have been abandoned when the farmlands wore out. Evidence has shown farmland (Burnt Corn Ruin) five miles east of Cerrillos was destroyed in battle. Tumbled stones, broken potsherds, and discarded tools of rock were discovered as records of their passing.

Many materials were mined out of Cerrillos. A Spanish explorer, Antonio de Espejo, wrote about these treasures being mined at a place of “little hills." This is the source of Cerrillos' name. The Pueblo Indians extracted turquoise from the hills; the Spaniards found gold, silver, and lead. The Taíno Indians were used for slave labor to mine these materials out of the hills, but several cave-ins made the Tano stop their excavations. They protested mining and covered up any existence of the mines, which lay dormant for 150 years.
  
Cerrillos was rediscovered in 1879 by two prospectors from Leadville, Colorado. Word spread fast of the treasures and soon many miners swarmed the hills of Cerrillos. The town became well known and people came from around the world to mine these materials for profit. The settlement started off as a tent city but soon grew into a town of many buildings, homes, a church, a school, and stores.

The rapid growth of Cerrillos gave opportunities to people who moved in. Hotels were built along with saloons, dance halls, shops, and short-order houses. There were not only profits for miners but businesses that provided for them as well. One of the town’s leading businesses was the Cerrillos Supply Company, which stocked equipment miners needed—shovels, picks, tools, steel, and fuses, to name a few.

By 1900 the mines began to shut down, and the booming town started to dwindle. A fraction of the population stayed in Cerrillos. Today, only a few of the buildings from Cerrillos' boom remain. Some of the buildings still show evidence of past movies filmed ("Young Guns" and "Outrageous Fortune") on Main Street. The church still stands at the end of Main Street and the local people attend mass on Sunday. A few businesses are open that tourists and locals can use, along with a petting zoo and a trading post featuring Cerrillos turquoise and a mining museum. Cerrillos Hill State Park has 5 miles of multi-use trails with an ADA trail to the village overlook. The State Park is located a half mile north of the village on CR 59.

Education
It is within Santa Fe Public Schools.

It is zoned to Amy Biehl Elementary School, Milagro Middle School, and Santa Fe High School.

Previously it was zoned to Capital High School. In 2017 the district recommended changing the boundary of the area to Santa Fe High.

See also

 List of census-designated places in New Mexico

References

Harris, Linda G., Ghost Towns Alive, University of New Mexico Press, 2003

Sherman, James E. and Barbara,  Ghost Towns and Mining Camps of New Mexico,  University of Oklahoma Press, Norman, Publishing Division of the University, 1975

Simmons, Marc, Turquoise and Six Guns The Story of Cerrillos, New Mexico, The Sunstone Press Santa Fe, New Mexico, 1974

Lawson, Jacqueline E., Cerrillos Yesterday, Today and Tomorrow The Story of a Won’t –Be Ghost Town, The Sunstone Press Santa Fe New Mexico, 1989

 

Los Cerrillos, New Mexico

External links

Census-designated places in Santa Fe County, New Mexico
Census-designated places in New Mexico